The 2012–13 Ekstraliga was the 38th edition of the women's football premier league in Poland. It ran from August 18, 2012, to June 12, 2013, with a mid-season break from November to March. KU AZS UJ Kraków, and KS Gosirki Piaseczno replaced relegated teams 1.FC Katowice and MUKS Tomaszów Mazowiecki.

Unia Racibórz won its fifth title in a row but with a smaller margin than in previous seasons, two points over Medyk Konin which also was the runner-up for the fourth straight time. Górnik Łęczna also repeated their third position. Pogoń Women Szczecin, which had defeated both Unia and Medyk, was disbanded during the mid-season break for financial reasons, leaving the competition one team short. Last-placed Bronowianka KU AZS UJ Kraków was thus the only relegated team.

Teams

League table

Results

Top scorers

References

Pol
women's